Charles Blakeslee Law (February 5, 1872 – September 15, 1929) was a U.S. Representative from New York.

Biography
Born in Hannibal, New York, Law attended the public schools and graduated from Colgate Academy in Hamilton, New York in 1891.  In 1895 he graduated from Amherst College in Amherst, Massachusetts.  Law studied law with an attorney in Rome, New York and at Cornell Law School in Ithaca, New York.

He was admitted to the bar in Rochester, New York, in 1897.  In 1898 Law moved to Brooklyn, New York where he commenced the practice of law.

Law was elected as a Republican to the Fifty-ninth, Sixtieth, and Sixty-first Congresses (March 4, 1905 – March 3, 1911).  He served as chairman of the Committee on War Claims (Sixty-first Congress).  He was an unsuccessful candidate for reelection in 1910.

He resumed the practice of law in Brooklyn.  From 1912 to 1913 Law served as Sheriff of Kings County, New York in 1912 and 1913.

Law was a Judge of Brooklyn's Municipal Court from January 1, 1916, to January 1, 1926.

After leaving the bench he resumed the practice of law in Brooklyn and was involved in banking and insurance as president of the Mortgage Title and Guarantee Company.

Death and burial
Law died while swimming at his summer home on Kattskill Bay, near Lake George, New York, on September 15, 1929.  He was interred in Maple Grove Cemetery in his wife's hometown, Jordan, New York.

References 

1872 births
1929 deaths
Amherst College alumni
Politicians from Rome, New York
Accidental deaths in New York (state)
Deaths by drowning in the United States
New York (state) lawyers
Sheriffs of Kings County, New York
New York (state) state court judges
Burials in New York (state)
Republican Party members of the United States House of Representatives from New York (state)
People from Oswego County, New York
People from Lake George, New York
19th-century American lawyers